Znamenny Musical Notation is a Unicode block containing characters for Znamenny musical notation from Russia.

Few fonts support this block as of 2021. Ones that do and are free for personal use include Symbola 14.0 and Slavonic 1.00 (non-commercial use only).

History
The following Unicode-related documents record the purpose and process of defining specific characters in the Znamenny Musical Notation block:

See also 

 Ancient Greek Musical Notation (Unicode block)
 Byzantine Musical Symbols (Unicode block)
 Musical Symbols (Unicode block)

References 

Unicode blocks